The 2013–14 All-Ireland Intermediate Club Football Championship was the 11th staging of the All-Ireland Intermediate Club Football Championship since its establishment by the Gaelic Athletic Association for the 2003–04 season.

The All-Ireland final was played on 9 February 2014 at Croke Park in Dublin, between Truagh Gaels and Kiltane. Truagh Gaels won the match by 2-21 o 2-13 to claim their first ever championship title.

References

2013 in Irish sport
2014 in Irish sport
All-Ireland Intermediate Club Football Championship
All-Ireland Intermediate Club Football Championship